Spheric may refer to:

 An alternate word for spherical
 Radio atmospheric, a lightning-generated electromagnetic signal
 Spheric, a 1998 album by Ray Buttigieg
 "Spheric", a song by American violinist Michael Galasso from the 2005 album High Lines